Ganyra howarthi, Howarth's white, is a butterfly in the family Pieridae. It is found along the coast in the southern half of Baja California and Sonora in Mexico. It is also found in extreme southern Arizona. The habitat consists of thorn forests and desert scrubs.

The upperside is white. The forewing has black wedges at the apex and outer margins and a black cell spot. The female forewing markings are more diffuse, with additional postmedian black spots. Adults are on wing year round in Baja California. They feed on flower nectar.

The larvae feed on Atamisquea emarginata in southern Arizona.

References

Pierini
Butterflies described in 1915